Anatomy of Gray is a play by Jim Leonard Jr. set in the 1880s. The play frequently breaks the fourth wall when the characters directly narrate the events in the story to the audience.

Plot synopsis 
The play starts with a prologue, in which June Muldoon explains that the town of Gray, Indiana is a very boring place. She says that the play will chronicle her story, and the first chapter is started.

The play then shifts to the funeral service of Adam Muldoon, June's late father and dedicated town farmer. After feeling immense grief at her father's loss, and seeing her mother's endless sorrow, June writes a letter to God in which she wishes for her town to receive a doctor, so that "nobody will ever die again."

Later, a massive storm, followed by a tornado, causes a man in a balloon to crash near the town. Rescued by June and the townspeople, he is revealed to be a doctor named Galen P. Gray, a fact which June is immensely excited by.

The townspeople, now with a relatively qualified doctor, start seeing him for all of their ailments. Despite Gray's ironic aversion to blood, he is quite helpful to the townspeople. Many of the largely uneducated citizens of Gray both look up to and misunderstand the doctor, creating many humorous situations. The doctor issues several diagnoses of their ailments and the townspeople are astounded by the doctor's intellect. June develops a crush on Gray and takes it upon herself to be his personal assistant. In the meantime, Gray falls in love with Rebekah Muldoon, June's mother, who is revealed to be pregnant with her late husband's daughter. Rebekah begs Gray for an abortion, but he refuses, liking her and her child too much to be able to bring himself to do it.

Gray begins to notice strange marks on certain townspeople, and soon those who are "marked" start becoming ill and even dying. Blaming the doctor for the appearance of the plague, Pastor Wingfield and a mob of other citizens attempt to chase Gray out of the town, but are stopped by June and the fact that the Pastor is suffering severely from kidney stones. Under the doctor's instruction, June manages to operate on the Pastor and save his life, causing the townspeople to soften up to the doctor.

Meanwhile, Rebekah gives birth to her baby, who is not marked like Rebekah. The sickness is getting worse, and more and more people are becoming afflicted every day. In a move to save those who they can, the townspeople and the doctor send June and her little sister, as well as Homer, a farm boy who has had a crush on June, in a raft across the river to the outside world. As the few who are not "marked" float away on the raft, the doctor comes to the conclusion that the illness is likely caused by contaminated water, remarking that he always boils his water, June mimics him in all aspects including his water-boiling habits, and Homer doesn't drink water (preferring soda pop, a running gag in the play). The play ends at its beginning with June explaining that she wrote down her history to tell to her little sister once she was old enough to understand it, and the opening lines are recited as the play is finished

References

External links 
 Official website of Samuel French Play Publishing
Review of the 2008 Oklahoma University production at OUDaily.com
Anatomy of Gray Sample Text

American plays
Plays set in Indiana